The Best of Nickelback Volume 1 is a compilation album by Canadian rock band Nickelback. It was released on November 4, 2013, through Roadrunner Records (internationally) and Universal Music Canada (in Canada) to coincide with their October–November 2013 "The Hits Tour". Though frontman Chad Kroeger had previously stated in an interview that their upcoming greatest hits album would include new songs as well as previous hits, the final track listing contains only previously released material. The compilation features singles released from all but the first two studio albums (1996's Curb and 1998's The State) from the band; Silver Side Up (2001), The Long Road (2003), All the Right Reasons (2005), Dark Horse (2008), and Here and Now (2011).

Track listing
All lyrics written by Chad Kroeger and all music composed by Nickelback, except where noted.

 Tracks 2, 7, and 12 from Silver Side Up (2001)
 Tracks 6 and 10-11 from The Long Road (2003)
Tracks 1, 4–5, 9, 14, and 17 from All the Right Reasons (2005)
 Tracks 3, 8, 15, and 18-19 from Dark Horse (2008)
 Tracks 13 and 16 from Here and Now (2011)

Reception

In a mixed review, AllMusic's Stephen Thomas Erlewine said the track listing ignored the band's first two albums, Curb and The State, and that its inclusion of only two songs from the band's then-most recent studio album, Here and Now, "accurately reflects [that album's] also-ran status". He said that the greatest hits compilation would not change the minds of "the band's haters – who are legion" but that "there's not a more listenable Nickelback album out there".

Charts and certifications

Weekly charts

Year-end charts

Certifications

References

Nickelback albums
2013 greatest hits albums
Roadrunner Records compilation albums
Universal Music Canada albums